Kenton Scott Edelin (May 24, 1962 – December 24, 2022) was an American basketball player and attorney. He played one season in the National Basketball Association (NBA).

Edelin attended the University of Virginia, where he was not offered a basketball scholarship, instead playing his freshman year for the Cavaliers' junior varsity team.  After growing two inches in his sophomore season, Edelin made the varsity team where as a senior he helped the team reach the 1984 Final Four.  For his college career, Edelin averaged 3.3 points and 4.6 rebounds per game.

After graduating from Virginia, Edelin was drafted in the seventh round (140th pick overall) of the 1984 NBA Draft by the Indiana Pacers. He played 10 games for the Pacers in the 1984–85 NBA season, averaging 1.1 points, 2.6 rebounds, and 1 assist per game for his NBA career. At the conclusion of his rookie season, he retired from basketball and returned to the University of Virginia to attend law school. He worked as an attorney and player agent until suffering a series of ischemic strokes in March 2022. Edelin died of stroke complications in Northern Virginia, on December 24, 2022, at the age of 60.

References

1962 births
2022 deaths
20th-century African-American sportspeople
21st-century African-American people
African-American basketball players
American men's basketball players
Basketball players from Virginia
Indiana Pacers draft picks
Indiana Pacers players
National Basketball Association players from Germany
Small forwards
Sportspeople from Heidelberg
Sportspeople from Alexandria, Virginia
Virginia Cavaliers men's basketball players